Rosevelt Colvin, III (born September 5, 1977) is a former American football linebacker, who now works as a football analyst for the Big Ten Network. Drafted by the Chicago Bears in the fourth round of the 1999 NFL Draft, he played college football at Purdue.

Colvin played for the Chicago Bears between 1999 and 2002. Colvin has earned two Super Bowl rings with the New England Patriots and has also been a member of the Houston Texans.

Early years
Colvin attended Broad Ripple High School in Indianapolis. He earned Second Team All-State honors as a junior, and recorded a school-record 219 tackles as a senior. In that final season at Broad Ripple, Colvin earned honors as an All-Marion County Player, the Indianapolis News Defensive Player of the Year, an All-Metro Player, and was a First Team All-State selection. He also played basketball in high school.

While at Purdue, Colvin was selected to the All-Big Ten teams in 1997 and 1998. The Boilermakers went 18-7 in his final two seasons in West Lafayette.

Professional career

Chicago Bears
Colvin was drafted by the Chicago Bears in the fourth round of the 1999 NFL Draft. He became the first Bear to post double-digit sacks in consecutive years, 2001–2002, since Richard Dent.

Colvin was named to the Bears' All-Decade Defense team along with fellow linebackers Brian Urlacher and Lance Briggs.

First stint with Patriots
After playing for the Bears, Colvin was signed by the New England Patriots in 2003. Early in his first season with New England, Colvin suffered a shattered socket in his left hip. It took Colvin a year to recover, while the Patriots won back-to-back Super Bowls. Colvin did not start again until 2005, and in 2006, he was a full-time starter at outside linebacker for the Patriots. He was placed on injured reserve by the Patriots on November 27, 2007.

On February 26, 2008, the Patriots released Colvin after he failed a physical with the team. He had one year left on his contract with a $5.5 million base salary.

Houston Texans
On June 16, 2008, Colvin signed with the Houston Texans. On August 29, 2008, the Texans released Colvin during final roster cuts.

Second stint with Patriots
Colvin was re-signed by the New England Patriots on December 3, 2008 after cornerback Jason Webster was placed on injured reserve.

Personal life
As a teenager, he worked at a concession stand in the RCA Dome in Indianapolis.

Colvin and his wife Tiffany reside in Indianapolis. Colvin owns five UPS stores in the area, as well as a cupcake shop called "SweeTies Gourmet Treats" that has two Indy based locations. They also run youth NFL FLAG leagues and the Indy Nets Basketball Club, www.r59.com.

He and his wife have four children, Xavier, Nijah, Raven, and Myles. His daughter, Raven, plays volleyball for the Purdue university.  His son, Myles, a rising HS senior, is a four-star basketball recruit committed to Matt Painter's Purdue team.  The family attends New Horizons Church in Indianapolis, pastored by Eric Wiggins.

References

External links
 Houston Texans bio
 New England Patriots bio
 RC Sports The Colvin's youth sports organizations

1977 births
Living people
Players of American football from Indianapolis
American football outside linebackers
American football defensive ends
Purdue Boilermakers football players
Chicago Bears players
New England Patriots players
Houston Texans players
People from Fishers, Indiana
Ed Block Courage Award recipients